Evgeniya Brik (Khirivskaya (Хиривская), 3 September 1981 – 10 February 2022) was a Russian actress, best known for playing Kalinka in the Belgian television series Matroesjka's.

Life and career
Evgenia Vladimirovna Khirivskaya was born on 3 September 1981 in Moscow. She was named after her paternal grandfather Yevgeny Abramovich Krein, who was a famous journalist. The actress took the surname Brik in honor of her paternal great-grandmother Sofia Brik, as a stage name. However, despite marriage and adopting a stage name, she never changed her legal documentation, thus keeping her maiden last name. She has Polish and Jewish ancestry.

At the age of 5, she successfully completed tryouts and was invited to work as a child model at the All-Union House of Fashion Design. In elementary and middle school, she focused on learning English, before applying for and graduating from a theater prep school. She also graduated from a music school as a classically trained pianist.

She studied at the Russian Academy of Theatre Arts and obtained her diploma in 2004.

In Russia, her breakthrough role was Katya, a university Komsomol unit leader, in the 2008 musical comedy-drama Stilyagi.

Personal life and death 
Brik was married to director Valery Todorovsky, with whom she had a daughter, Zoey Valeryevna Todorovskaya, born in 2009 in Los Angeles. Zoey had her acting debut as young Prairie Johnson in The OA, a 2016 Netflix Original series. Brik died from cancer on 10 February 2022, at the age of 40.

Filmography

References

External links
 
 RusActors (Russian)

1981 births
2022 deaths
21st-century Russian actresses
Actresses from Moscow
Russian Academy of Theatre Arts alumni
Russian people of Polish descent
Russian people of Jewish descent
Russian film actresses
Russian stage actresses
Russian television actresses
Deaths from cancer in California